Bernd Althusmann (born 3 December 1966) is a German politician of the Christian Democratic Union (CDU). Since November 2017, he has been serving as Deputy Minister-President and State Minister for Economic Affairs in the government of Minister-President Stephan Weil.

Career
From 1994 to 2009, Althusmann was Member of the Landtag of Lower Saxony. He served as State Minister of Education in the cabinets Wulff II and McAllister from 27 April 2010 until 19 February 2013. 

In July 2011 it was reported that Althusmann had taken over texts or literal texts in several places in his dissertation. The University of Potsdam has not confirmed the plagiarism allegations, despite deficiencies.

Between 2013 and 2016, Althusmann headed the Konrad Adenauer Foundation's office in Windhoek, Namibia.

Althusmann was the CDU's leading candidate for the 2017 Lower Saxon state election.

On the national level, Althusmann served as a CDU delegate to the Federal Convention for the purpose of electing the President of Germany in 2010, 2012, 2017 and 2022. In the negotiations to form a coalition government under the leadership of Chancellor Angela Merkel following the 2017 federal elections, he co-chaired the working group on urban development; his counterparts were Kurt Gribl and Natascha Kohnen. Together with Monika Grütters, Daniel Günther, Michael Kretschmer and Armin Laschet, Althusmann co-chaired the CDU’s national convention in Berlin in February 2018. 

Since 2022, Althusmann has been chairing a working group charged with drafting the CDU’s positions on energy policy.

Other activities

Regulatory agencies
 Federal Network Agency for Electricity, Gas, Telecommunications, Post and Railway (BNetzA), Alternate Member of the Advisory Board

Corporate boards
 Volkswagen, Ex-Officio Member of the Supervisory Board (since 2017)
 Deutsche Messe AG, Ex-Officio Chairman of the Supervisory Board (since 2017) 
 JadeWeserPort, Ex-Officio Chairman of the Supervisory Board (since 2017)
 Niedersachsen Ports GmbH & Co. KG (NPorts), Ex-Officio Chairman of the Supervisory Board (since 2017)

Political positions
During his election campaign, Althusmann publicly favored someone from outside the auto industry to succeed VW chief executive Matthias Müller and wanted to cede one of the state’s two board seats to a non-political expert. But when his party lost the 2017 state elections to the SPD, he claimed the economy minister’s right to join VW’s supervisory board alongside Minister-President Weil.

Ahead of the Christian Democrats’ leadership election in 2021, Althusmann publicly endorsed Armin Laschet to succeed Annegret Kramp-Karrenbauer as the party’s chair. For the 2021 national elections, he later also endorsed Laschet as the Christian Democrats' joint candidate to succeed Chancellor Angela Merkel.

References

Ministers of the Lower Saxony State Government
1966 births
Christian Democratic Union of Germany politicians
Living people